Adrian Paluchowski (born 19 August 1987) is a Polish professional footballer who plays as a forward for Wisła Puławy.

Career

Club
In March 2008 he went on loan to Znicz Pruszków in the Polish second division. He returned to Legia in January 2009. In January 2010, he was loaned to on one-year deal. He returned to Legia half year later and was sold to Górnik Łęczna.

In 2020, Paluchowski signed for Wisła Puławy.

References

External links

 
 
 

1987 births
Living people
Polish footballers
Ekstraklasa players
I liga players
II liga players
III liga players
Legia Warsaw II players
Legia Warsaw players
Znicz Pruszków players
Piast Gliwice players
Górnik Łęczna players
Bruk-Bet Termalica Nieciecza players
Zagłębie Sosnowiec players
MKP Pogoń Siedlce players
Stal Mielec players
Wisła Puławy players
Footballers from Warsaw
Association football forwards
Poland youth international footballers